Csikszentmihalyi may refer to:

People
 Mihaly Csikszentmihalyi, a social psychologist known for his work on happiness, creativity, and flow theory
 Christopher Csíkszentmihályi, an artist and technologist

See also 
 Csíkszentmihály, the Hungarian language name of Mihăileni, a commune in eastern Transylvania